The Desktop Linux Consortium (DLC) was a non-profit organization which aims at enhancing and promoting the use of the Linux operating system on desktop computers.

It was founded on 4 February 2003.

Members 

Ark Linux
CodeWeavers
Debian
KDE
Linux Professional Institute (LPI)
The Linux Terminal Server Project (LTSP)
Lycoris (company)
Mandriva (formerly known as Mandrakesoft)
NeTraverse
OpenOffice.org Organisation, does not exist any more
Questnet (Support4Linux.com)
Samba
Sunwah Linux (rays Linux Distribution)
SUSE
theKompany
TransGaming Technologies
TrustCommerce
Xandros
Ximian

See also 
 Desktop Linux

References

External links 
 Archived version of the official website as of 2007

Linux organizations